Robert Kaliňák (born 11 May 1971) is a Slovak politician who was the Deputy Prime Minister and the Minister of the Interior of Slovakia from 4 July 2006 to 12 March 2018. He is a member of the Direction – Social Democracy party. Kaliňák previously served as Minister of the Interior from 4 July 2006 to 8 July 2010. Kaliňák resigned on 12 March 2018 after the murder of Slovak journalist Ján Kuciak. He left as the longest serving minister in the history of modern Slovakia.

Early life and education 

Robert Kaliňák was born on 11 May 1971 in Bratislava. His father was a sailor and his mother worked as a teacher. After graduating from a technical school, he enrolled at the Law Faculty of the Comenius University in Bratislava from 1989 to 1995. During the Velvet Revolution of 1989, he took part as a member of the coordinating committee in the student movement.

While studying, he successfully entered the world of entrepreneurship in 1990 by opening a student restaurant, and a publishing house and printing office of scholarly literature. During his studies, he also started his career in a law office in 1992. Kaliňák and his partners established a chain of restaurants called “Steam & Coffee” in 1999, while he engaged also in other lines of business. After entering politics, he retired as an executive from all business activities.

Political career 

Robert Kaliňák is one of the founding members of the political party Direction – Social Democracy (Slovak: Smer – sociálna demokracia, Smer-SD). Since its foundation, he has held various posts in the party; he has been a member of the board since 2001, and has served as Deputy Chairman since 2004.

2002–2006  
He was elected Member of the National Council of the Slovak Republic, and served Chairman of the Committee of the National Council of the Slovak Republic for Defence and Security. During these years in office, he had to uncover and solve several political scandals such as the “Skupinka” (Group - problem of antisemitic reports in Slovak Intelligence Service) case and cases involving wire-tapping of journalists. Consequently, the Committee proposed an act to protect personal privacy against wire-tapping. The act has been in force since 2004.

In his capacity of Chairman of the Committee, Kaliňák proposed an act that would compensate victims of the 1968 Invasion of four Warsaw Pact allies, and the Firearms Amnesty Act, which led to the submission of 8000, until then, illegal firearms in a two-round amnesty.

2006–2010 
Following the results of the 2006 parliamentary elections, Robert Kaliňák was appointed Deputy Prime Minister and Minister of Interior of the Slovak Republic. During his years in office, Slovakia successfully joined the Schengen Area and the Visa Waiver Program of the United States of America. As far as criminality was concerned, the crime rate significantly decreased, especially the violent crime rate. A major improvement was achieved in the accident rate, where the number of automobile fatal accidents dropped from 627 (2007) to 355 (2009).

While Kaliňák held the post of Minister of Interior, he had to face scandals such as the case of Hedvig Malina or the Slovak Police training explosives incident.

2010–2012 
Robert Kaliňák was re-elected to the National Council of the Slovak Republic, and also to the post of Chairman of the Special Supervision Committee of the Slovak Intelligence Service.

Within the first two years of his appointment, the Military Counterintelligence Service carried out an investigation into wire-tapping of journalists.

2012–2016 
The 2012 parliamentary elections led to his second appointment as Deputy Prime Minister and Minister of Interior.

While he performed his duties, he initiated several major reforms such as “ESO” – the reform of the public administration which should represent savings of 700 million euros (1% of GDP), the reform of the rescue system, emergency management and the integration of volunteer fire brigades into the capacities of Integrated Rescue Services, and the reform of public procurement with the introduction of an electronic auction system, the “state’s eBay” project. Other major reforms include a reform of the Armed Forces pension scheme with savings of up to 200 million euros and the reform of the state policy concerning marginalized Roma communities.

In the fight against crime, a noteworthy result was achieved in the number of homicides (the lowest rate since the independence of Slovakia) and the fact that Slovakia has for the first time fulfilled the commitment to the European Union to reduce the number of road fatalities by 50% (235).

2016–2018 

He was nominated again as the Minister of Interior of the Slovak Republic, after the parliamentary elections in 2016. He also served as a deputy of Prime Minister Robert Fico. During his mandate he initiated complex reform of Roma communities. He has built and opened first hospital since the Velvet revolution. He has issued modernization of the state airline services as well as complete overhaul of state aircraft. As a finale of his ESO reform he opened dozens of client service centers across the country. This reform has achieved 95% approval of public opinion and was deemed a major success. He has also managed to finish modernization of the Fire and Rescue Service.

While Kaliňák was holding the post of Minister of Interior, he faced several criticisms from the side of opposition regarding his purchase of shares from shareholder, who was later investigated for tax fraud. Kaliňák resigned as an interior minister as well as the PM deputy on the 22nd March 2018 after the murder of an investigative reporter Ján Kuciak.

References 

1971 births
Living people
Politicians from Bratislava
Direction – Social Democracy politicians
Members of the National Council (Slovakia) 2002-2006
Members of the National Council (Slovakia) 2010-2012
Interior ministers of Slovakia
Slovak people of Bulgarian descent
Businesspeople from Bratislava